Bátonyterenye is a district in eastern part of Nógrád County. Bátonyterenye is also the name of the town where the district seat is found. The district is located in the Northern Hungary Statistical Region.

Geography 
Bátonyterenye District borders with Salgótarján District to the north and west, Pétervására District (Heves County) to the east, Gyöngyös District (Heves County) to the south, Pásztó District to the southwest. The number of the inhabited places in Bátonyterenye District is 8.

Municipalities 
The district has 1 town and 7 villages.
(ordered by population, as of 1 January 2013)

The bolded municipality is the city.

Demographics

In 2011, it had a population of 21,789 and the population density was 101/km².

Ethnicity
Besides the Hungarian majority, the main minority is the Roma (approx. 2,000).

Total population (2011 census): 21,789
Ethnic groups (2011 census): Identified themselves: 20,878 persons:
Hungarians: 18,766 (89.88%)
Gypsies: 1,775 (8.50%)
Others and indefinable: 337 (1.61%)
Approx. 1,000 persons in Bátonyterenye District did not declare their ethnic group at the 2011 census.

Religion
Religious adherence in the county according to 2011 census:

Catholic – 10,453 (Roman Catholic – 10,400; Greek Catholic – 53);
Reformed – 398;
Evangelical – 189; 
other religions – 284; 
Non-religious – 4,468; 
Atheism – 219;
Undeclared – 5,778.

Gallery

See also
List of cities and towns of Hungary

References

External links
 Postal codes of the Bátonyterenye District

Districts in Nógrád County